The National Portland Cement Limited tramway was a 2ft gauge rail line that served the cement works at Darlington on Maria Island in Tasmania from 1923 to July 1930.

The line connected three quarries (one at Fossil Cliffs on the east coast of the island and two smaller quarries further inland) with both the cement works at Darlington and the new jetty built specifically for the cement works.  The tramway was used to bring limestone from the quarries to the works, coal from the jetty to the powerplant and cement kiln, and to take bagged cement from the works to the jetty for shipping. At least 32 4-wheel side-tipping hopper wagons were used.

Two locomotives were used on the line:

The cement works proved unprofitable due to poor-quality limestone, transport costs from the island, and the economic effects of the Great Depression. It closed in July 1930 and most of the equipment was shipped to Port Fairy in Victoria.

References 

Closed railway lines in Tasmania
Railway lines closed in 1930
Railway lines opened in 1923
1923 establishments in Australia